ISO 3166-2:MW is the entry for Malawi in ISO 3166-2, part of the ISO 3166 standard published by the International Organization for Standardization (ISO), which defines codes for the names of the principal subdivisions (e.g., provinces or states) of all countries coded in ISO 3166-1.

Currently for Malawi, ISO 3166-2 codes are defined for two levels of subdivisions:
 3 regions
 28 districts

Each code consists of two parts, separated by a hyphen. The second part is either of the following:
 one letter: regions
 two letters: districts

Current codes
Subdivision names are listed as in the ISO 3166-2 standard published by the ISO 3166 Maintenance Agency (ISO 3166/MA).

ISO 639-1 codes are used to represent subdivision names in the following administrative languages:
 (en): English
 (ny): Chichewa

Click on the button in the header to sort each column.

Regions

Districts

Changes
The following changes to the entry have been announced in newsletters by the ISO 3166/MA since the first publication of ISO  in 1998:

See also
 Subdivisions of Malawi
 FIPS region codes of Malawi

External links
 ISO Online Browsing Platform: MW
 Districts of Malawi, Statoids.com

2:MW
ISO 3166-2
ISO 3166-2
Malawi geography-related lists